Antipater was a Greek physician and contemporary of Galen at Rome in the 2nd century AD. Galen gave an account of Antipater's death and the morbid symptoms that preceded it.

Notes

2nd-century Greek physicians